Kilbride Bridge is a bridge in Dunoon, Argyll and Bute, Scotland. A Category C listed structure, it carries the traffic of Auchamore Road. It is made of red sandstone rubble, and has a segmental arch span. The bridge is toll-free.

Gallery

References

Listed bridges in Scotland
Listed buildings in Dunoon
Category C listed buildings in Argyll and Bute
Bridges in Argyll and Bute
Stone bridges in Scotland
Transport in Dunoon